, is a Japanese term for a cafe at which customers can listen to classical music while they are drinking coffee and other beverages. People can request their favorite music at many locations.

Meikyoku kissa first appeared during the 1950s. Most people could not buy expensive LP records, so they listened to classical music at the cafes.

Recently the number of meikyoku kissa has been on the decline.

See also
No-pan kissa
Manga kissa
Internet café
Jazz kissa

References

Types of coffeehouses and cafés
Classical music